Žrnova is a small dispersed settlement in the Municipality of Radenci in northeastern Slovenia.

References

External links
Žrnova on Geopedia

Populated places in the Municipality of Radenci